Bohdan Ulihrach (born 23 February 1975) is a former professional tennis player from the Czech Republic.

Career
Ulihrach turned professional in 1993. He won his first top-level singles title in July 1995 at Prague, where he defeated Javier Sánchez in the final. His second followed three months later at Montevideo, where he beat Alberto Berasategui in the final.

In 1996, Ulihrach was part of the Czech Republic team which finished runner-up at the World Team Cup. In 1997, en-route to his first hardcourt final at the Indian Wells Masters, Ulihrach beat the then-world No. 1, Pete Sampras. In the final, he was defeated by Michael Chang. Ulihrach reached a career-high singles ranking of world No. 22 in May 1997.

He reached the fourth round at both the Australian Open and the French Open, in 1999.

In 2003, Ulihrach was cleared of a doping charge.

At the 2007 French Open, he beat the No. 24 seed Dominik Hrbatý in the first round in five sets.

ATP career finals

Singles: 9 (3 titles, 6 runner-ups)

ATP Challenger and ITF Futures finals

Singles: 9 (6–3)

Performance timeline

Singles

References

External links
 
 
 

1975 births
Living people
Czech expatriate sportspeople in Monaco
Czech male tennis players
Doping cases in tennis
Sportspeople from Kolín
People from Monte Carlo
Czech sportspeople in doping cases